An O-type main-sequence star (O V) is a main-sequence (core hydrogen-burning) star of spectral type O and luminosity class V. These stars have between 15 and 90 times the mass of the Sun and surface temperatures between 30,000 and 50,000 K. They are between 40,000 and 1,000,000 times as luminous as the Sun.

Spectral standard stars

The Morgan–Keenan–Kellerman (MKK) "Yerkes" atlas from 1943 listed O-type standards between O5 and O9, but only split luminosity classes for the O9s. The revised Yerkes standards ("MK") presented listed in Johnson & Morgan (1953) presented no changes to the O5 to O8 types, and listed 5 O9 V standards (10 Lacertae) and 3 O9.5 V standards (Sigma Orionis, Zeta Ophiuchi). An important review on spectral classification by Morgan & Keenan (1973) listed "revised MK" standards for O4 to O7, but again no splitting of standards by luminosity classes. This review also listed main-sequence "dagger standards" of O9 V for 10 Lacertae and O9.5 V for Sigma Orionis.

O-type luminosity classes for subtypes earlier than O5 were not defined with standard stars until the 1970s. Walborn & Fitzpartrick (1990) provided the first digital atlas of spectra for OB-type stars, and included a main-sequence standard for O3 V. Spectral class O2 was defined in Walborn et al. (2002), with the star  acting as the O2 V primary standard (actually type "O2 V((f*))"). They also redefined  as an O4 V standard, and listed new O3 V standards ( and ).

Properties
These are exceedingly rare objects; it is estimated that there are no more than 20,000 class O stars in the entire Milky Way, around one in 10,000,000 of all stars.
Of the few there are, all class O stars are very young – no more than a few million years old – and in our galaxy they all have high metallicities, around twice that of the sun.
Surface gravities are around 10 times that of the Earth, which is relatively low compared to other main sequence stars.

Visual absolute magnitudes range from about −4 (eqv. 3,400 times brighter than the sun) to about −5.8 (eqv. 18,000 times brighter than the sun).

Their light-driven stellar winds have a terminal velocity around 2,000 km/s.
The most luminous class O stars have mass loss rates of more than  each year, although the least luminous lose far less. 
O-type main sequence stars in the Large Magellanic Cloud have lower metallicity (which makes their interiors less opaque than typical stars in the Milky Way) and noticeably higher temperatures, with the most obvious cause being lower mass loss rates, reduced because of their lower opacity.

Prominent O-class main sequence stars
 θ Muscae is a naked-eye Wolf-Rayet star, but the majority of the visible light is produced by an O-class main sequence companion and an OB supergiant.
 9 Sagittarii is a spectroscopic binary containing O3.5 and O5–5.5 main sequence stars, making for the brightest star visible within the Lagoon Nebula.
 μ Columbae is a naked-eye O9.5 main sequence star.
 θ1 Orionis C is the brightest star in the Trapezium cluster in the Orion nebula, an O6 main sequence star with a fainter spectroscopic companion.
 ζ Ophiuchi is an O9.5 main sequence star, the brightest in the sky at 3rd magnitude.

See also 
 Star count, survey of stars
 Wolf-Rayet stars

References

Star types